Boyland is a surname. Notable people with the surname include:

Ari Boyland (born 1987), New Zealand stage and television actor
Doe Boyland (born 1955), American baseball player
John Boyland (1874–1922), Australian trade unionist and politician
Rosanne Boyland (????-2021), an American woman who died during the January 6th protests
Steve Boyland, New Zealand association footballer
Thomas S. Boyland (1942–1982), American politician
William Boyland (Australian politician) (1885–1967), member of the Victorian Legislative Assembly
William F. Boyland, New York assemblyman
William Boyland Jr., his son, New York assemblyman

See also
Boyland Common